Avoch railway station was a station on the single track branch of the Highland Railway, in north east Scotland. The line connected villages in The Black Isle peninsula to the railway network via a junction at Muir of Ord.

History

Opened by the Highland Railway in 1894, it became part of the London, Midland and Scottish Railway during the Grouping of 1923. The station then passed on to the Scottish Region of British Railways on nationalisation in 1948. It was then closed by British Railways.

Authorisation was obtained on 4 July 1890 to build a 15.75 mile (25 km) branch line from Muir of Ord to Rosemarkie; however the line never proceeded beyond Fortrose.

References

Notes

Sources
 
 
 
 Station on navigable O.S. map
 Vallance, H.A. (1985). The Highland Railway. 4th Extended edition: extra material by C.R. Clinker and Anthony J. Lambert. Newton Abbot: David St John Thomas. .

External links
 Avoch station on navigable O. S. map

Disused railway stations in Ross and Cromarty
Former Highland Railway stations
Railway stations in Great Britain opened in 1894
Railway stations in Great Britain closed in 1951
1894 establishments in Scotland
1951 disestablishments in Scotland
Black Isle